In Protestant Reformation history, confessionalization is the parallel processes of "confession-building" taking place in Europe between the Peace of Augsburg (1555) and the Thirty Years' War (1618-1648). During this time prior to the Thirty Years' War, there was a nominal peace between the Protestant and Catholic confessions as both competed to establish their faith more firmly with the population of their respective area. This confession-building occurred through "social-disciplining," as there was a stricter enforcement by the churches of their particular rules for all aspects of life in both Protestant and Catholic areas. This had the consequence of creating distinctive confessional identities that influenced church dogma, faith formation, liturgy, and the development of universities.

The German historian Ernst Walter Zeeden first described the phenomenon of 'confession building' (Konfessionsbildung) in the 1950s. In the 1970s, Wolfgang Reinhard and Heinz Schilling further developed these ideas in parallel, applying their ideas to church-state formation in Roman Catholic and Lutheran contexts in the Holy Roman Empire.

Calvin's Geneva is also a model case for the confessional era because of its high degree of social control, unity and homogeneity under one expression of a reformed Christian faith. The Genevan model was informed by an interpretation of Erasmus' humanism. The reformation had shown the independent character of northern Europe to resist acceptance to Catholic orthodoxy and thus called for an end to the Corpus Christianum. The new model sought to establish a decentralized Christian community, rooted in the belief that one's own interpretative theology was correct and sufficient.

Confessionalization was supported by monarchs and rulers in general, because after the Reformation had brought control over their territories' churches into their hands, they could exercise more power over their subjects by enforcing strict religious obedience. The main tool for the enforcement of these rules were "police-regulations". These were behavior codes for religious, social and economic life to which the common citizen had to oblige under threat of severe punishment.

Increasingly, the secular governments (sometimes in cooperation or conflict with the churches they controlled) provided material relief for the poor and needy, and in return the state demanded obedience and increased taxes from its subjects. Thus, confessionalization is often described as a development stage towards both the absolutist state of the 18th century and the modern welfare state.

Nancy Shields Kollmann used the term "confessionalization" to refer to the religious arbitration and control used in the Russian Empire to manage the activity of non-Orthodox religions such as Catholicism, Lutheranism, Islam, Judaism, and Buddhism. Tsarist Russia, a multi-confessional empire with one state religion, banned the proselytization of other faiths to Orthodox Christians. However, the tsarist administration supported centralizing institutions within other religions (such as the Orenburg Assembly) insofar as they would aid in local administration and were allied with the state.

Further reading
 Confessionalization forum (H-German, 2005)
 Lutheran church organization and confessionalization (Britannica Online)
 Confessionalization: Reformation, Religion, Absolutism, and Modernity
 Headley, John M. and Hans J. Hillerbrand, eds. (2004). Confessionalization in Europe, 1555–1700: Essays in Honor and Memory of Bodo Nischan. Farnham, Eng: Ashgate.

References

16th-century Protestantism